Pierre Sabbagh (18 July 1918 – 30 September 1994) was a major personality in French television, as a journalist, producer and director.

Pierre Alain Sabbagh was born in Lannion (Côtes-d'Armor) and died in Paris.  He was the younger son of the artist Georges Hanna Sabbagh and the art historian and resistance heroine Agnès Humbert. His brother was naval officer Jean Sabbagh.

Television 

Pierre Sabbagh became a war correspondent in the hope of finding his mother Agnès in World War II.  He had visited her in Fresnes Prison and the Prison de la Santé in 1942, a few days before she was deported by the Nazis, sentenced to slave labour in Germany.  In 1944, he travelled into Germany behind the advancing American army, but did not find her until he returned to Paris in 1945.

Pierre Sabbagh presented and directed the first television news in the world on 29 June 1949.

His greatest success was the creation, in 1966, of the programme "Au théâtre ce soir" ("The Theatre Tonight") following a strike on French television and the success of a Belgian television comedy called "La Bonne planque", which provoked the appetite of the public for this kind of programme: over 300 plays were produced in the series.  To his credit also is the first audiovisual game which reunited France of the 1960s in front of the black-and-white screen:  "L'Homme du XXe siècle" ("20th Century Man"), a game of general cultural questions which went on for many years and which finished with the final "Super homme du XXe siècle" ("20th Century Superman") which brought together all the previous winners of whom the comedian, Robert Manuel, beat a professor of complementary medicine, Georges Rivault.

He was Director-General of the television network France 2 between September 1971 and July 1972.

His wife was the French television presenter and actress Catherine Langeais.

Publications 

Pierre Sabbagh, Antoine Graziani, Fanina, paperback, Pan Macmillan, 1965 
Pierre Sabbagh, Antoine Graziani (tr. Ellen Hart and Cornelia Brookfield), Fanina, 1966
Pierre Sabbagh, Antoine Graziani (tr. Marguerite Barnett), Fanina, Child of Rome, hardback, London, Pan Macmillan 1969,  (also New York, Bantam, 1968)
Pierre Sabbagh, Le guide de la Pipe et du Tabac, Paris, Stock, 1973
Pierre Sabbagh, Le guide Marabout de la pipe et du tabac, Paris, Editions Marabout, 1973
Jean Sabbagh and Pierre Sabbagh, Georges Sabbagh, Paris, J. Sabbagh, 1981  
Pierre Sabbagh, Encore vous, Sabbagh!, Paris, Stock, 1984

Filmography 

Le second souffle, 1959, film, actor (directed by Yannick Bellon)
Monsieur Vernet, 1988, television film, director
La pomme, 1991, television film, director
Le Noir te va bien, 1991, television film, director
L'amour fou, 1991, television film, director

References

Humbert, Agnès (tr. Barbara Mellor), Résistance: Memoirs of Occupied France, London, Bloomsbury Publishing PLC, 2008  (American title: Resistance: A Frenchwoman's Journal of the War, Bloomsbury, USA, 2008)
Sabbagh, Pierre, Encore vous, Sabbagh!, Paris, Stock, 1984

External links 
 Site de l'INA

1918 births
1994 deaths
People from Lannion
French male journalists
French television journalists
French television producers
French television directors